Louise Johanna "Anneke" Grönloh (7 June 1942 – 14 September 2018) was an Indonesian-born Dutch singer. She had a successful career starting in 1959 that lasted throughout the 1960s, and scored a hit with "Brandend zand", one of the best-selling Dutch songs of all time.

Early life 
Grönloh was born in Tondano, North Sulawesi, Dutch East Indies (present-day Indonesia), and spent her early years in the Japanese-occupied Dutch East Indies in a Japanese concentration camp. Her father, an officer of the Royal Netherlands East Indies Army (KNIL), had been interned before her birth. After the war, the family moved to the Netherlands, and Grönloh grew up in Eindhoven.

Career 

During her time in secondary school, she met Peter Koelewijn with whom she began performing at parties. In 1959, her career took off after she won a talent show. On 31 August 1964 she married Wim-Jaap van der Laan, a DJ at the Dutch radio station Radio Veronica, and in 1965 began singing in the Sleeswijk Revue. 

Throughout the 1960s she scored hits, especially with "Brandend zand" (Burning sand). At the height of her fame, Grönloh represented the Netherlands in the Eurovision Song Contest 1964 with the song "Jij bent mijn leven" (You are my life), finishing in tenth place, and by the end of the 1960s she had begun an international singing career.

Besides popular music, Grönloh performed songs in the kroncong genre, such as "Bengawan Solo", "Boeroeng Kakatua", and "Nina Bobo", as well as jazz songs, which according to her was her favourite musical genre.

In 2000, Grönloh was named "Singer of the Century" in the Netherlands because of the record-breaking sales of "Brandend zand". In the same year, she was also a participant on the television program Big Brother VIPS. In 2006 she released Anneke and Friends, a DVD of her theater tours. Later that year she was part of the theater tour "Purple 100", replacing Corry Brokken who could not perform due to illness.

Grönloh had retired due to health problems, having played her last show on 26 August 2017. She died on 14 September 2018 in Arleuf, France, aged 76.

Discography 
"Asmara" (1960, in Indonesian)
"Flamenco Rock"
"Brandend zand" (1961) – gold
"Paradiso" (1962) – platinum
"Soerabaja" (1963)
"Cimeroni" (1963)
"Oh Malaysia" (1963)

References

External links

 

1942 births
2018 deaths
People from Minahasa Regency
Indo people
Eurovision Song Contest entrants for the Netherlands
Dutch women singers
Dutch people of Indonesian descent
Eurovision Song Contest entrants of 1964
Musicians from Eindhoven
Philips Records artists
Nationaal Songfestival contestants